Café Royale Halt (Manx: Stadd Café Royale) is a stopping place on the Manx Electric Railway and is located a short distance from the previous halt, serving the café of the same name.  Despite many and various changes of name to the café/restaurant over the years (its current incarnation being the "Majestic" Chinese Restaurant) the name of the stopping place has remained the same, although no station nameboard to that effect has ever been erected on the site.

Railway stations in the Isle of Man
Railway stations opened in 1893